Kannur East is suburb of Kannur city in Kerala, India.

Townships and villages
 Elayavoor. 31,545 people.
 Varam. 14,739 people
 Eachur. 300,241 people
 Chelora. 36,500 people
 Kanhirode. 13,954 people

Important Landmarks
     
 Koodali Higher Secondary School
 CHMHSS Elayavoor
 Vivekananda Vidyalayam
 Regional Paultry farm or Central Hatchery
Kadakkara Sri Dharmasastha kshetram
Valannur Rishieswara Kshetram
Chelora Someshwary Kshetram
Chelora Govt. Higher Secondary School
Mini industrial estate, Chelora
Lulu Mall, Kannur
Mundayad indoor stadium
Mundayad Juma Masjid
PUB-G Arena
Elayavoor Kshetram
VARAM SREE VISWAKARMMA DHEVI KSHETRAM

Munderi Bird Sanctuary
Munderi Kavu bird sanctuary is famous for migratory birds.  The area is rich in biodiversity and is waiting to get developed as an eco-tourism hot spot.

Elayavoor
Elayavoor is a suburb adjacent to Kannur city. This place was formerly a village famous for its paddy field but due to fast urbanization most of the paddy fields have disappeared.

Location

References

Suburbs of Kannur